Shak may refer to:

 The Shak, a television series
 Shak, acronymic name given to Shabbatai ha-Kohen (1621–1662)
 Shake Shack (NYSE: SHAK), American restaurant chain

People

Given name
Shak Adams (born 1998), American soccer player

Surname
Beth Shak (born 1969), American poker player
Dan Shak (born 1959), American poker player
Steve Shak (born 1978), American soccer player
Therese Wai Han Shak (1932–2010), Hong Kong teacher and nonprofit executive

See also
 Shack (disambiguation)
 Shaki (disambiguation)
 Shaq (disambiguation)